State Road 356 (NM 356) is a state highway in the US state of New Mexico. NM 356's southern terminus is in the city of Bayard at U.S. Route 180 (US 180), and the  northern terminus is NM 152.

Major intersections

See also

References

356
Transportation in Grant County, New Mexico